Phosphotyrosine interaction domain containing 1 is a protein that in humans is encoded by the PID1 gene.

References

Further reading